Το πρωινό is a television morning program airs on ANT1 on 14 October 2013 every Monday to Friday at 9:50am to 1pm, It was hosted by Giorgos Liagkas and Fay Skorda, featuring Giorgos Lianos, Sasa Stamati, Themis Georgantas and Laura Narges are the persons who had been selected to be with Giorgos and Fay. Litsa Patera (astrology) in 10pm and Argiro Mparmparigou (cooking) in 11pm continue to be on ANT1.

Hosts

Timeline

Special hosts

Panelists

Astrology

Cooking

See also
List of programs broadcast by ANT1

ANT1 original programming
Greek television news shows
2013 Greek television series debuts
2010s Greek television series
Greek-language television shows